James Neil Tucker (January 12, 1957 – May 28, 2004) was a convicted murderer executed by the U.S. state of South Carolina by means of the electric chair. He was convicted of the murders of Rosa Lee "Dolly" Oakley and Shannon Lynn Mellon.

Childhood and life before murders

Tucker was born in Utah, the youngest of three children. After his mother divorced, she remarried to a man with four children of his own. An eighth child came from this marriage. Tucker claimed during his trial and appeals that his stepfather had punished him severely, and as a youth, Tucker had committed petty crimes in an attempt to be taken out of the home by the authorities.

In 1974, Tucker was convicted of raping an eight-year-old girl and an 83-year-old woman. He received a sentence of one to 15 years from the Salt Lake County District Court. Four years later he was again before the courts, this time for escape and theft, receiving another one to 15 years sentence. He would spend most of his adult life in jail, escaping on three occasions in all. His longest period as a fugitive was five years in the 1980s.

While in prison, he became friends with a fellow inmate from South Carolina. The two went to Calhoun County, South Carolina, where in 1984 they worked at the Webb Carroll's Training Center, a horse farm east of St. Matthews. He went back into prison in Spartanburg County after being arrested for housebreaking and larceny. He was sentenced to 10 years. 

After being released in 1988, he was sent back to Utah where he received another one to 15-year sentence for escaping prison. On being released in March 1992, Tucker returned to South Carolina. He married his pregnant girlfriend, Marcia, in Sumter. After he was sentenced to death, she divorced him.

The murders
54 year old Rosa Lee "Dolly" Oakley was gardening in the front yard of her Sumter home on June 25, 1992, when Tucker drove his car up her driveway. After talking to her and making sure she was alone, he pulled out a .25-caliber handgun, and forced her inside into her bedroom. Joe Black and James Howard then arrived at the house, looking for Oakley's husband. Tucker allowed her to answer the door, where she told them that her husband wasn't home. They left, but as they backed down the driveway, she ran out of the house screaming "Don't leave me, he's going to kill me." Tucker dragged her back into the house and stole $14 from her purse. As she went for the telephone, Tucker fired the gun, hitting her in the head. According to Tucker, "I shot her again before I left just because, as stupid as it sounds, I thought she was suffering. So I put her out of her misery."

Tucker managed to evade police capture for the next week. During this time, he hid in delivery trucks, one time hiding in the undercarriage of a semi-trailer. He also continued his burglary, breaking into the Christian Fellowship Church and the mobile homes of Kenneth Parker and Myron Baker. He hitched rides to St. Matthews, where he stole a station wagon from a funeral home, but abandoned it after getting it stuck in a wooded area. His next destination was a cottage owned by the Webb Carroll's Training Center on July 1.

The cottage was home to Shannon Lynn Mellon, 21 years old, who was training to be a jockey. In the yard was a Chevrolet Blazer and a Ford Mustang. While Tucker was deciding what to do, a man emerged from the cottage and drove off in the Blazer. Tucker then entered the house and found Mellon asleep. He bound her with masking tape and decided to kill her and dump her body in the woods. He shot her once in the back of the head and stole $20. According to Tucker, she was not killed by the first shot and said "I can't see", so he shot her again. As he started to leave, she was still breathing, so she was shot once more, this time in the temple region. He drove to Spartanburg in her stolen Mustang.

Ten days after killing Mellon, he was arrested in Maggie Valley, North Carolina and the next day gave a 48-page confession to police.

Trial and appeals

In separate trials in 1993 and 1994, Tucker was sentenced to death twice, once for the murder of Mellon and once for Oakley.
The death sentence in the Mellon case was later overturned, because jurors had not been told that Tucker would be ineligible for parole under a life sentence; after a second sentencing phase the death sentence was reimposed.

Tucker was diagnosed by psychiatrists as having antisocial personality disorder, and was described as being very intelligent.
He did not ask for clemency from the governor.

Tucker was executed in the electric chair on May 28, 2004. His final statement was read by his lawyer:

See also
 Capital punishment in South Carolina
 Capital punishment in the United States
 List of people executed in South Carolina
 List of people executed in the United States in 2004

General references

Clark County Prosecutor

1957 births
2004 deaths
American rapists
American people executed for murder
21st-century executions by South Carolina
People executed by South Carolina by electric chair
Executed people from Utah
People convicted of murder by South Carolina
People with antisocial personality disorder
American escapees
Escapees from Utah detention
21st-century executions of American people